Alfred Methuen (15 February 1868 – 5 March 1949) was a Scotland international rugby union player.

Rugby Union career

Amateur career

He played for Cambridge University and then London Scottish.

Provincial career

He played for East of Scotland District against West of Scotland District in their match of 26 January 1889. He was still classed a Cambridge University player for the match.

International career

He played twice for Scotland; both times in 1889.

Administrative career

He was elected President of London Scottish in 1931.

Family

His father was James Methuen (1830-1873); his mother Murdina Bell (1841-1908). He was one of their five children.

He married Eleanor Hoey Forde (1867 - 1937) in Kingston, Surrey in April 1891. They had four children. One of his sons Lionel Harry Methuen joined the Argyll and Sutherland Highlanders in the First World War, won the Military Cross, and was awarded an O.B.E. in 1919.

References

1869 births
1949 deaths
Cambridge University R.U.F.C. players
East of Scotland District players
London Scottish F.C. players
Rugby union players from Edinburgh
Scotland international rugby union players
Scottish rugby union players
Rugby union forwards